The Department of Labor and Employment (commonly abbreviated as DOLE) is one of the executive departments of the Philippine government mandated to formulate policies, implement programs and services, and serve as the policy-coordinating arm of the Executive Branch in the field of labor and employment.  It is tasked with the enforcement of the provisions of the Labor Code.

History
The Department of Labor & Employment (DOLE) was founded on December 7, 1933, via Act No. 4121 by the Philippine Legislature. It was renamed as Ministry of Labor and Employment in 1978. The agency was renamed as a department after the People Power Revolution in 1986.

List of the Secretaries of the Department of Labor and Employment

Bureaus
 Bureau of Local Employment (BLE)
 Bureau of Labor Relations (BLR)
 Bureau of Working Conditions (BWC)
 Bureau of Workers with Special Concerns (BWSC)
 International Labor Affairs Bureau (ILAB)

Attached Agencies
 Employees' Compensation Commission (ECC)
 Institute for Labor Studies (ILS)
 National Conciliation and Mediation Board (NCMB)
 National Labor Relations Commission (NLRC)
 National Wages and Productivity Commission (NWPC)
 Occupational Safety and Health Center (OSHC)
 Professional Regulation Commission (PRC)
 Education and Skills Development Authority (TESDA)

Seals

References

 
Labor and Employ|Labor and Employment
Ministries established in 1933
Philippines
Labor in the Philippines
1933 establishments in the Philippines